Héctor Hugo Varela Flores is a Mexican politician affiliated with the PRI. He served as Deputy of the LIII Legislature of the Mexican Congress representing Guanajuato.

External links
 Héctor Hugo Varela Flores

References

Living people
Politicians from Guanajuato
Members of the Chamber of Deputies (Mexico)
Institutional Revolutionary Party politicians
20th-century Mexican politicians
Year of birth missing (living people)
People from León, Guanajuato
Universidad de Guanajuato alumni